is a 1980 Japanese film directed by Keiichi Ozawa.

Cast
Jun'ichi Ishida
Miyuki Matsuda
Kaori Takeda
Jun Tanaka

Reception
It was chosen as the 9th best film at the 2nd Yokohama Film Festival.

References

1980s Japanese films